Anaerolinea thermolimosa is a thermophilic, non-spore-forming, non-motile, Gram-negative, filamentous bacteria with type strain IMO-1T (=JCM 12577T =DSM 16554T).

References

Further reading
 Beatty, Tom J. Genome Evolution of Photosynthetic Bacteria. Vol. 66. Academic Press, 2013.
 Tewari, Vinod, Vinod C. Tewari, and Joseph Seckbach, eds.STROMATOLITES: Interaction of Microbes with Sediments: Interaction of Microbes with Sediments. Vol. 18. Springer, 2011.
 Dilek, Yıldırım. Links Between Geological Processes, Microbial Activities & Evolution of Life: Microbes and Geology. Eds. Yildirim Dilek, H. Furnes, and Karlis Muehlenbachs. Vol. 4. Springer, 2008.

External links
 
 LPSN
 Type strain of Anaerolinea thermolimosa at BacDive -  the Bacterial Diversity Metadatabase

Gram-negative bacteria
Thermophiles
Chloroflexota
Bacteria described in 2006